This is the list of notable stars in the constellation Chamaeleon, sorted by decreasing brightness.

See also
List of stars by constellation
DI Cha, a star system (not a star) where 4 stars orbit each other

References

List
Chamaeleon